Hennadiy Bleznitsov (born on 6 January 1941 in Kharkiv) is a retired Ukrainian pole vaulter who represented the USSR. He trained at Burevestnik and later at the Armed Forces sports society in Kharkov. He represented his country twice at the Olympic Games, reaching the finals in both 1964 and 1968.

Bleznitsov won two medals at the Universiade, winning the 1963 title in a championship record of 4.60 m before taking a silver in 1965 behind American John Pennel. He was the inaugural pole vault champion at the annual 1966 European Indoor Games and won three silver medals in the subsequent years, beaten by fellow Soviet Igor Feld and East Germany's Wolfgang Nordwig. He was twice a medallist at the European Cup and competed at the 1966 European Athletics Championships, though he failed to register a height.

He won a total of ten Soviet national titles in the pole vault, including four straight wins outdoors from 1963 to 1966. One of the best vaulters of his generation, he ranked in the global top ten for five straight years, from 1965 to 1969.

International competitions

National titles
Soviet Athletics Championships
Pole vault: 1963, 1964, 1965, 1966, 1968, 1970, 1972
Soviet Indoor Athletics Championships
Pole vault: 1964, 1966, 1967

See also
List of European Athletics Indoor Championships medalists (men)

References

1941 births
Living people
Sportspeople from Kharkiv
Soviet male pole vaulters
Ukrainian male pole vaulters
Olympic athletes of the Soviet Union
Athletes (track and field) at the 1964 Summer Olympics
Athletes (track and field) at the 1968 Summer Olympics
Burevestnik (sports society) athletes
Armed Forces sports society athletes
Universiade medalists in athletics (track and field)
Universiade gold medalists for the Soviet Union
Universiade silver medalists for the Soviet Union
Medalists at the 1963 Summer Universiade
Medalists at the 1965 Summer Universiade